John Alfred Paulson (born December 14, 1955) is an American billionaire hedge fund manager. He leads Paulson & Co., a New York-based investment management firm he founded in 1994. He has been called "one of the most prominent names in high finance", "a man who made one of the biggest fortunes in Wall Street history," and a "hedge fund swindler".

His prominence and fortune were made in 2007 when he earned almost $4 billion and was transformed "from an obscure money manager into a financial legend" by using credit default swaps to effectively bet against the U.S. subprime mortgage lending market. In 2010, Paulson earned $4.9 billion. The Forbes real-time tracker estimated his net worth at $3 billion as of January 2023.

Early life and education
Paulson was born on December 14, 1955, in Queens, New York, the third of four children of Alfred G. Paulson (1924–2002) and Jacqueline (née Boklan, 1926–2018).

His father was born Alfredo Guillermo Paulsen in Ecuador to a father of half French and half Norwegian descent and an Ecuadorian mother. Alfredo was orphaned at fifteen and at age sixteen moved to Los Angeles with his younger brother Alberto.  Alfredo enlisted in the US Army where he served and was wounded in Italy during World War II. He later changed his surname from Paulsen to Paulson.

John's mother was the daughter of Jewish immigrants from Lithuania and Romania who had moved to New York City. Jacqueline met Alfredo while they both attended UCLA. They wed and moved to New York City, where Alfredo worked at Arthur Andersen and later as the CFO at public relations firm Ruder Finn.

Realizing that his previously chosen career path in sales would not provide a steady and secure cash flow, Paulson returned to NYU in 1976 where he began to excel in business studies. In 1978, he graduated valedictorian of his class summa cum laude in finance from New York University's College of Business and Public Administration. He went on to Harvard Business School, on a Sidney J. Weinberg/Goldman Sachs scholarship, earning an MBA as a George F. Baker Scholar (top 5 percent of his class) in 1980.

Career
Paulson began his career at Boston Consulting Group in 1980 where he did research, providing advice to companies. Ambitious to work in investment on Wall Street, he left to join Odyssey Partners where he worked with Leon Levy. He moved on to Bear Stearns working in the mergers and acquisitions department, and then to Gruss Partners LP, where he was a general partner.

In 1994, he founded his own hedge fund, Paulson & Co., with $2 million and one employee, located in office space rented from Bear Stearns on the 26th floor of 277 Park Avenue. The firm moved to 57th and Madison in 2001. By 2003, his fund had grown to $300 million in assets.

Paulson and his company specialize in "event-driven" investments—i.e. in mergers, acquisitions, spin-offs, proxy contests, etc.—and he has made hundreds of such investments throughout his career. Many of the events involved merger arbitrage—which has been described as waiting "until one company announces that it's buying another, rushing to purchase the target company's shares, shorting the acquirer's stock (unless it's a cash deal), and then earn the differential between the two share prices when the merger closes." An example of a proxy event investment Paulson made was during Yahoo's proxy contest in May 2008, when Carl Icahn launched a proxy fight to try to replace Yahoo's board.

In 2010, he set another hedge fund record by making nearly $5 billion in a single year, primarily investing in the gold sector. However, in 2011, he made losing investments in Bank of America, Citigroup and the fraud-suspected China-based Canadian-listed company, Sino-Forest Corporation. His flagship fund, Paulson Advantage Fund, fell sharply in 2011. Paulson has also become a major investor in gold.

Subprime Mortgage Crisis

Paulson became world-famous in 2007 by shorting the US housing market, as he foresaw the subprime mortgage crisis and bet against mortgage-backed securities by investing in credit default swaps. Sometimes referred to as the greatest trade in history, Paulson's firm made a fortune and he earned over $4 billion personally on this trade alone.

Paulson convinced Goldman Sachs to market risky home loans in Arizona, California, Florida and Nevada as safe investments. Together, Paulson and Goldman created the Abacus 2007-AC1 investment vehicle and kept Paulson's bet against the underlying assets from people who purchased it. Paulson escaped indictment because his firm maintained that it was always transparent about its view of the mortgages that had been securitized. Goldman was sued by the Securities and Exchange Commission and had to reach a settlement for their lies about Abacus. On July 15, 2010, Goldman settled out of court, agreeing to pay the SEC and investors US$550 million, including $300 million to the U.S. government and $250 million to investors, one of the largest penalties ever paid by a Wall Street firm.

Political and economic views
Paulson contributed $140,000 to political candidates and parties between 2000 and 2010, 45% of which went to Republicans, 16% to Democrats, and 36% to special interests, including former House Speaker John Boehner.

In 2011, Paulson donated $1 million to Mitt Romney's Super PAC Restore Our Future. On April 26, 2012, Paulson hosted a fundraiser at his New York townhouse for Romney's presidential candidacy.

Paulson received media attention after immediately backing Donald Trump after he secured the GOP nomination. Paulson served as one of the top economic advisers to Donald Trump's 2016 presidential campaign.

In 2008, Paulson co-wrote a Wall Street Journal op-ed piece suggesting an alternative to the Treasury Secretary's plan for stabilizing the markets. The alternative plan included recapitalizing the troubled financial institutions by spending the $700 billion Troubled Asset Relief Program funds to buy their senior preferred stock rather than their "worst assets".

In 2008 while testifying before US House Committee on Oversight and Government Reform Paulson was asked about the low tax rate on long-term capital gains and carried interest earnings and Paulson replied  "I believe our tax situation is fair."  In a 2012 interview with Bloomberg Businessweek magazine he expressed displeasure over the Occupy Wall Street movement, noting:

We pay a lot of taxes, especially living in New York—there's an almost 13 percent city and state tax rate.  ... Most jurisdictions would want to have successful companies like ours located there. I'm sure if we wanted to go to Singapore, they'd roll out the red carpet to attract us.

At the 2014 Puerto Rico Investment Summit in San Juan, Paulson stated: "Puerto Rico will become the Singapore of the Caribbean." Paulson was reportedly investing in the territory's municipal debt and real estate developments, and was building a home at a resort.

In 2017, Paulson and his wife wrote a letter to the elite Manhattan Spence School, threatening to withdraw aid if the school continued its "alarming pattern" of "anti-white indoctrination". In the letter, they stated: "In fact for children of all races, we strongly believe that schools should value and define success in terms of hard work, earned accomplishment, merit, a commitment to academic rigor, and personal integrity."

Wealth and philanthropy
Between 2009 and 2011 Paulson made several charitable donations, including $15 million to the Center for Responsible Lending, $20 million to New York University Stern School of Business (auditorium now named after Paulson), $5 million to the Southampton Hospital on Long Island, $15 million to build a children's hospital in Guayaquil, Ecuador, and £2.5 million to the London School of Economics for the John A. Paulson Chair in European Political Economy. In October 2012, Paulson donated $100 million to the Central Park Conservancy, the nonprofit organization that maintains New York City's Central Park. At the time of the donation, the gift represented the largest monetary donation in the history of New York City's park system. In June 2015, Paulson donated $400 million to Harvard University's School of Engineering and Applied Sciences (SEAS), the largest gift received in the university's history. Following the donation, the engineering school was renamed the Harvard John A. Paulson School of Engineering and Applied Sciences. The next month, he gifted $8.5 million to New York City's largest charter school organization, Success Academy, to change public education and open up middle schools in the Bedford-Stuyvesant area of Brooklyn and in the Hell's Kitchen area of Manhattan.

In 2022, New York University announced that Paulson had donated $100 million towards the cost of a new building in its Washington Square Campus. The building was named the John A. Paulson Center in recognition of the gift.

Personal life
In 2000, he married Jenny Zaharia, in an Episcopalian ceremony in Southampton, New York. Jenny was a Romanian immigrant who came to the United States after her brother George, a track star in Romania, defected and moved to Queens. They have two daughters, Giselle and Danielle, and live most of the year in a 28,500-square-foot Upper East Side townhouse on East 86th Street, obtained for $14.7 million in 2004. He also owns a home in Aspen purchased for $24.5 million in 2010 and an estate in Southampton that he bought for $41 million in 2008. Paulson has an older sister named Theodora Bar-El, an Israeli biologist.

Paulson filed for divorce in September, 2021, but has withdrawn his divorce action so both sides can negotiate out of court and out of the media.

See also
The Big Short and The Big Short (film) recount many of the events described in Gregory Zuckerman's 2009 book The Greatest Trade Ever: The Behind-the-Scenes Story of How John Paulson Defied Wall Street and Made Financial History
List of New York University alumni
List of Harvard University people

References

Further reading

External links
 Interview: "Excellent timing: Face to Face with John Paulson," (Pensions & Investments) 
 "The man who made too much" (Portfolio magazine)
 John Paulson-related articles at The New York Times
 Interview and Profile (Hedge Fund News)
 John Paulson & Co 2011 Year-End Firm Letter
 Paulson Townhouse By Delano & Aldrich 
 Goldman Sachs, Paulson settle fraud lawsuit over Abacus

1955 births
American billionaires
American chairpersons of corporations
American chief executives
American commodities traders
American financial analysts
American financiers
American hedge fund managers
American investors
American management consultants
American money managers
American people of Ecuadorian descent
American people of French descent
American people of Lithuanian-Jewish descent
American people of Norwegian descent
American people of Romanian-Jewish descent
American political fundraisers
American stock traders
Boston Consulting Group people
Businesspeople from Queens, New York
Harvard Business School alumni
Living people
People from the Upper East Side
People from Queens, New York
People from Southampton (town), New York
New York University Stern School of Business alumni
Stock and commodity market managers
New York (state) Republicans